John Hayden (b. 1863 -  d. Feb 26, 1934) was a United States Navy sailor and a recipient of the United States military's highest decoration, the Medal of Honor.

Biography
Born in 1863 in Washington, D.C., Hayden joined the Navy from that city. By July 15, 1879, he was serving as an apprentice on the training ship . On that day, while Saratoga was anchored off Battery Park in New York Harbor, Apprentice Robert Lee Robey fell overboard and was swept away by a strong tidal current. Without hesitation, Apprentice David M. Buchanan jumped into the water and went to Robey, who was not a strong swimmer. Hayden witnessed the event and, when it seemed that Buchanan needed assistance, he too jumped overboard and helped keep Robey afloat until all three men were picked up by the ship's boat. For this action, both Hayden and Buchanan were awarded the Medal of Honor a week later, on July 22.

Hayden's official Medal of Honor citation reads:
On board the U.S. Training Ship Saratoga. On the morning of 15 July 1879, while the Saratoga was anchored off the Battery, in New York Harbor, R. L. Robey, apprentice, fell overboard. As the tide was running strong ebb, the man, not being an expert swimmer, was in danger of drowning. David M. Buchanan, apprentice, instantly, without removing any of his clothing, jumped after him. Stripping himself, Hayden stood coolly watching the 2 in the water, and when he thought his services were required, made a dive from the rail and came up alongside them and rendered assistance until all 3 were picked up by a boat from the ship.

See also

List of Medal of Honor recipients in non-combat incidents

References

External links

1863 births
1934 deaths
People from Washington, D.C.
United States Navy sailors
United States Navy Medal of Honor recipients
Non-combat recipients of the Medal of Honor